The Commercial Bank of Manitoba was incorporated in 1884 and ceased operation in 1893. The president during most of its operation was Duncan MacArthur, a businessman and politician in Manitoba. It experienced financial difficulties during most of its years of operation and suspended payment in July, 1893 because of heavy withdrawals. It never resumed operation although it was later found to still be solvent.

A prominent Canadian political figure, Alphonse Alfred Clément Larivière, was one of the directors.

During its brief history, it was a Canadian banknote issuer and the bills that still survive are collectors items.

References
 Dictionary of Canadian Biography - Duncan MacArthur

Defunct banks of Canada
Banks established in 1884
Banks disestablished in 1893
1884 establishments in Manitoba
1893 disestablishments in Manitoba
Canadian companies established in 1884